The 1955 Maryland Terrapins football team represented the University of Maryland, College Park in the 1955 college football season as a member of the Atlantic Coast Conference (ACC). Their perfect 10–0 regular season culminated with a bid to the 1956 Orange Bowl, where they faced top-ranked Oklahoma. Maryland lost, 6–20. Maryland's 25–12 victory over Clemson on November 12 was referenced in the 1989 film, Back to the Future Part II, which primarily took place on the same day.

Schedule

References

Maryland
Maryland Terrapins football seasons
Atlantic Coast Conference football champion seasons
Maryland Terrapins football